Jay Robert Leeuwenburg (born June 18, 1969) is a former American football offensive lineman in the National Football League for the Kansas City Chiefs, Chicago Bears, Indianapolis Colts, Cincinnati Bengals, and the Washington Redskins. He played college football at the University of Colorado and was drafted in the ninth round of the 1992 NFL Draft.

He was born in St. Louis, Missouri. At age twelve, Leeuwenberg was diagnosed with type 1 diabetes. Leeuwenburg coauthored the book Yes I Can! Yes You Can! with Denny Dressman, an autobiography that focuses on his struggles with diabetes and his journey to the NFL.

Leeuwenburg currently works as a college football analyst on The mtn television network, of the NCAA Mountain West Conference. He is also an elementary school teacher at Colorado Academy, a high-achieving private K-12 school in Denver.
He is a coach at D evelyn high school

References

1969 births
Living people
All-American college football players
American football offensive linemen
Chicago Bears players
Cincinnati Bengals players
Colorado Buffaloes football players
Indianapolis Colts players
People with type 1 diabetes
Players of American football from St. Louis
Washington Redskins players